Clan Stewart of Appin is the West Highland branch of the Clan Stewart and have been a distinct clan since their establishment in the 15th century.  Their Chiefs are descended from Sir James Stewart of Perston, who was himself the grandson of Alexander Stewart, the fourth High Steward of Scotland.  His cousin Walter Stewart, the 6th High Steward, married Marjorie Bruce, the daughter of King Robert the Bruce, and their son Robert II was the first Stewart Monarch. The Stewarts of Appin are cousins to the Royal Stewart Monarchy.

History

Origins of the clan

The Appin Stewarts is the West Highland branch of Clan Stewart, descend from Sir James Stewart of Perston, 4th son of Sir John Stewart of Bonkill, second son of Alexander, the 4th High Steward of Scotland. Sir James was the grandfather of John Stewart of Innermeath, who, through marriage to Isabel MacDougall, daughter of John Gallda MacDougall, Lord of Lorne, became the first Stewart Lord of Lorne. The Lordship of Lorne passed down for 2 more generations to Sir John Stewart, the third Stewart Lord of Lorne.

Appin is located on the Scottish West Coast between Benderloch to the South and the Ballachulish Narrows to the north in modern-day Argyll. Today the primary towns include Port Appin and Portnacroish. Both are scenic and are surrounded by forests and water. To the west are islands including the island of Lismore, home to the MacLea and the Baron Buchull, keeper of the Buchull Mhòr (the crosier of St. Moluag), adherents of Appin. There are numerous sights of interest including Ardsheal's Cave, Castle Stalker, the Clach Ruric, Cnap a-Chaolais, Eilean Munde and Keil churchyard.

15th century

Tradition tell us that in 1445, while returning to his seat at Dunstaffnage Castle from the great cattle tryst at Crieff, Sir John met and fell in love with the daughter of MacLaren of Ardvech. Although married, he began an affair with his new love which one year later produced a son. The first son of this union was called Dugald, and went on to become the progenitor of the famous Clan Stewart of Appin. Sir John Stewart was born around 1410, putting him at about 35 when he met the woman that would become his second wife.

After the death of his first wife, Sir John waited for five years before setting up the marriage between himself and Dugald's mother. We do not know why, but it there may have been political reasons. In 1463, Sir John set a wedding date and sent for Dugald and his mother to come to Dunstaffnage. Unknown to Sir John, there was a plot to kill the Lord of Lorn. It is not fully known, but it is thought to have been set up by the Lord of the Isles who was in a power struggle with the King of Scots, and who saw it as being in his best interest to neutralize this powerful and loyal representative of the King in the west highlands. The other plotters, which some feel included Colin Campbell, Lord Argyll, Sir John's son-in-law, were primarily represented by Alan MacCoul, the illegitimate grandson of an earlier MacDougall chief. As the lightly armed wedding party made its way from Dunstaffnage to the small chapel about 180 yards from the castle walls, they were attacked by a superior force led by Alan MacCoul. Although better armed, MacCoul's force was defeated, but not before mortally wounding the Lord of Lorn. Sir John was rushed into the chapel and MacCoul and his henchmen ran into and occupied the deserted Dunstaffnage. With his last breath Sir John married Dugald's mother, legitimising him and making him the de jure Lord of Lorn. After receiving the last rites, Sir John expired and a new chapter in West Highland history opened. Dugald gathered all the adherents of the Lord of Lorn and with the assistance of the MacLarens laid siege to Dunstaffnage, but to no avail. Unbeknownst to Dugald, Colin Campbell, Lord Argyll, who seemed to have been involved in the plot, raised a group of MacFarlanes to aid MacCoul in his struggle against the de jure Lord of Lorn. MacCoul's men with the MacFarlanes met the men of Lorn and MacLaren in what was to be known as the battle of Leac a dotha. It was a fierce battle with both sides leaving the field with very heavy losses.

For the next few years Dugald, who had lost the title of Lord of Lorn through the treachery of his uncle Walter Stewart and the lord of Argyll, but had retained Appin and Lismore, consolidated his power and fortified the hunting lodge of Castle Stalker on the Cormorant's Rock in Loch Laich. He also ensured that the Campbells were in no doubt about his displeasure over the loss of the Lordship of Lorn, by having the Campbell territory surrounding Appin regularly raided by the clan. Finally, in 1468, in a bid to finally destroy the power of Appin, Colin Campbell and Walter Stewart, the latter now recognised as the Lord of Lorn (but with no authority in Lorn), organised a massive raid against Dugald and his clan. Alan MacCoul was again involved and they met at what was to be known as the Battle of Stalc. Though losing many men, Dugald virtually destroyed the military strength of the MacFarlanes (a destruction from which they were never to recover) and personally killed Alan MacCoul, his father's murderer. The battle solidified Dugald's claim to Appin and the surrounding area, which was formally granted to him by King James III on 14 April 1470. In 1497 or 1498 Dugald Stewart of Appin was killed at the Battle of Black Mount fighting against the Clan MacDonald of Keppoch.

17th century and Civil War

The Clan Stewart of Appin supported the royalist, James Graham, 1st Marquess of Montrose at the Battle of Inverlochy (1645), the Battle of Auldearn and the Battle of Kilsyth.  After James VII was deposed in 1688, the Stewarts of Appin supported the deposed House of Stuart.

18th century and Jacobite risings

Appin naturally supported the Jacobite risings and sent men to fight in the Jacobite rising of 1715. General Wade's report on the Highlands in 1724, estimated the clan strength at 400 men. Dugald Stewart, 9th Chief of Appin, was created Lord Appin in the Jacobite peerage on 6 June 1743. Appin also sent men to fight in the Jacobite rising of 1745.  At the Battle of Culloden in 1746, the Appin Regiment suffered 92 killed and 65 wounded out of a fighting force of approximately 300. Charles Stewart of Ardsheal led the men of the regiment (which included men of ~19 other clans) most notably Clan MacLaren during the rising of 1745. Ardsheal later escaped Scotland to meet his family in Europe where he spent the rest of his days.

Ardsheal's Cave

On 23 July 1745, Prince Charles Edward Stuart (Bonnie Prince Charlie) landed on the white sands of the Outer Hebridean island of Eriskay, accompanied only by a small band of companions known as the "Seven Men of Moidart." This was the start of his claim to the Scottish and English throne and the second Jacobite uprising; on 16 April 1746 the Jacobite cause was finally put to rest at the battle of Culloden. Charles Stewart of Ardsheal, one of the Prince's commanding officers, hid from the English Red Coats in a cave as they searched up and down the country for those involved. This place was henceforth known as Ardsheal's Cave.

The Stewarts of Ardsheal were the second most important Cadet family of the Stewarts of Appin, second only to the Stewarts of Invernahyle. Totally loyal to the Jacobite cause, Stewart of Ardsheal led the regiment raised by the Stewarts of Appin at Culloden. They suffered appalling casualties when breaking the ranks of Barrell's and Munro's regiments of foot of the Hanoverian army. However the outcome of Culloden was almost certain before it began. The Jacobite army, tired, hungry, improperly equipped and grossly out numbered were decisively defeated. After their victory the English, led by the Duke of Cumberland, were ordered to execute all the Jacobite wounded and imprisoned. For this he was hereafter known as "The Butcher".
Having escaped death both in battle and the immediate aftermath Stewart of Ardsheal made for his family seat, Ardsheal House, Kentallen Bay. His hope was that if he could evade capture for long enough some sort of amnesty or deal would eventually be struck. Nevertheless, none of the Jacobites in this predicament could imagine the determination and ruthlessness of Cumberland.

Over the coming months 3,500 Jacobites were rounded up and imprisoned; of these 120 were immediately executed (mainly clan leaders) and a further 90 died in prison. 1,000 were transported to the colonies and 250 "banished". 700 disappeared, their fate unknown. In addition the clan system was destroyed with the Act of Proscription, they were disarmed and the kilt and tartan banned. It was in this climate that Ardsheal returned home and knowing full well his fate, should he be caught, immediately went into hiding. He wanted to be near his wife and new born son so with her help he hid in the cave above his house. His wife would bring food and occasionally he would venture out under cover of darkness.

Eventually the Red Coats came and Ardsheal House was cordoned off and his wife and child held prisoner. She must have been a brave woman because she gave nothing away claiming that she hadn't seen or heard of her husband since he left with the Jacobite army. The Red Coats thoroughly searched the surrounding area whilst Ardsheal himself was hiding under their noses. One account states that on two occasions they walked within yards of his hideout.

The secret of Ardsheal's success was with the cave itself or more importantly its situation. It lies behind a tall waterfall which completely hides the entrance especially when the burn is in flood. Unless one knows of its whereabouts one could be standing five yards away and never find it. It stretches back some fifteen or twenty feet and is easy to stand up in however; it tapers down to no more than two or three feet at the back. The walls and floor are a bit damp but there is a dryer place towards the rear. Nevertheless, it is perfectly comfortable and completely sheltered from the elements outside. It can only be approached from one way – directly up the steep sided burn and is far enough away from Ardsheal House to make it a fairly arduous and demanding climb. If however, one's position is known then escape is virtually impossible. The constant noise of falling water drowns out any approaching sounds and the only way out is the same as the way in. Pursuers would be on their quarry in seconds before they could take a step. On the whole, though, it makes a perfect hiding place and one can imagine avoiding detection indefinitely and in complete safety. That said, Charles Stewart of Ardsheal was known to have been a large man of great personal strength and a proficient swordsman – one of the best in the highlands. One can't help but think that he was like a caged lion and impatient to leave.

The threat of capture for Charles Stewart of Ardsheal continued long after the Red Coats had left Ardsheal House. If it wasn't an English soldier who turned him in it was more likely to be a fellow Scotsman particularly from the South. The Jacobite cause was to put a catholic King back on the throne, this was considered by many as taking a step backwards. For the Lowland Presbyterians the defeat of the Jacobites was a cause for celebration. The Union and the Presbyterian system of church government were safe. Realising that no amnesty was ever likely to be forthcoming Ardsheal eventually fled to France and his lands were forfeited to the Crown. His son Duncan Stewart of Ardsheal succeeded in having the lands restored later in the eighteenth century and the Stewarts of Ardsheal then succeeded to the Chiefdom of Appin upon the extinction of the Appin family.

Appin Murder

Appin was the site of the infamous Appin Murder of 1752, when Colin Roy Campbell of Glenure, 'the Red Fox' – who had been placed as government factor of the forfeited Stewart lands in Appin – was shot in the back by an unknown sniper while riding along the shore of Loch Leven at Ballachulish. Although termed a 'murder' by a Campbell/Hanoverian court, the assassination of a land agent responsible for ordering mass evictions would not have been an uncommon occurrence in the 18th century British Isles. Whoever the shooter may have been, after the chief suspect, Alan Breck Stewart, made his escape, the half-brother of the chief, a cadet named James of the Glens was charged with the murder, tried by a Campbell jury in the Campbell stronghold of Inveraray presided over by MacAilein Mòr himself, and, perhaps not surprisingly, was convicted and hanged on the shore of Loch Leven at Cnap a-Chaolais in Ballachulish. The consensus at the time and the general opinion of historians has been that James Stewart had nothing to do with ordering the shooting. The incident was made famous by Robert Louis Stevenson, the plot of whose novel Kidnapped incorporated the death of Glenure. As an interesting postscript many have tried to identify the shooter but without success. The identity is known within the Chief's family and when asked the current Chief stated that he had read and heard every theory and that none were close to being correct. The "mystery" continues.

The Daoine Uaisle
The daoine uaisle (Gaelic: noble people), as they were known into the 18th Century are synonymous with the term "Tacksmen" and the modern designation of "Cadet." These were/are the gentry of the clan (all clans incorporated these positions). Normally related in one form or another by birth to the Chief, these men controlled areas, or "tacks", within the greater clan lands. Rents were collected in various forms and rents from the daoine uaisle  were in turn paid to the Chief within some clans, and not in others. The primary "Cadets" of Appin are Ardsheal, Achnacone, Fasnacloich, Invernahyle, and Strathgarry. The major branches of Appin stem from the sons of Alan Stewart, 3rd of Appin. Originally they comprised John, 1st of Strathgarry, Dugald, 1st of Achnacone, James, 1st of Fasnacloich and Alexander, 1st of Invernahyle. Ardshiel, the branch our Chief hails from, was given to John, 1st of Ardshiel by his father, John Stewart, 5th of Appin. Andrew Francis Stewart of Lorn, Appin and Ardsheal, 17th of Appin & 12th of Ardsheal, the current Chief of Appin is descended from Charles Stewart, 7th of Ardsheal who ascended as Chief upon the death of Dugald Stewart, our 10th Chief, who died without sons in 1769. Today Andrew Francis Stewart holds the title of both "Appin" (denoting the Chief) and Ardsheal.

Adherents and clansmen

The Adherents or "septs" (a modern term) of Appin stem from families that lived in Lorn prior to the Stewarts gaining the Lordship and the clan coalescing. These were/are the MacColls, who descended from Black Solomon, son of Coll, son of the Lord of the Isles, The MacLeays or Livingstones (anglicized from MacLeay), who were reported to be on Lismore in 1130, but whose heritage is so old that no one really knows their beginnings, The MacGillemichaels, or their anglicized form "Carmichael", are also so old that we can only guess. It is known that they were present in Appin prior to the 13th century. The Combichs descended from a family nickname from north Appin (occasionally anglisized as Thomson) and the MacRobbs were/are actually Stewarts, descending from Robert, son of Dugald, 1st of Appin. The MacInnes, originally from the area of Morvern, settled in the area in the early 15th century. Adherents included/include the MacLaurins, Carmichaels, MacCombichs, MacColls, MacGillemichaels, McIlmichaels, MacInness, MacLeays, MacMichaels and MacRobbs (related by blood to the Stewarts).

See also

Scottish clan
Clan Stewart
Stewart of Balquhidder
Clan Stuart of Bute

References

External links
 Appin of Yesteryear
The Appin Stewarts
The Stewart Society
Friends of Appin
The Appin Historical Society 

Appin